Judith Slaying Holofernes is a 1620–1621 painting by Artemisia Gentileschi, now in the Uffizi Gallery in Florence. Like her earlier version of the work, Judith is thought to be a self-portrait. This connection may relate to Artemisia's sexual assault at the hands of her father's colleague, Agostino Tassi. When Artemisia was 17, her neighbor—an older woman named Tuzia—let Tassi into Artemisia’s home through an adjoining door. There, he raped her, while Artemisia called out for help. Artemisia’s father, Orazio Gentileschi, sued Tassi for taking his only daughter’s virginity.

During the trial, Artemisia recounted the altercation with Tassi and her effort to defend herself, stating: "After he had done his business he got off me. When I saw myself free, I went to the table drawer and took a knife and moved toward Agostino, saying, 'I'd like to kill you with this knife because you have dishonored me.'"

Artemisia painted an earlier version of Judith and Holofernes (Museo Capodimonte, Naples) sometime before 1612. In this later version, Artemisia added a detail that supports the idea that she identified with Judith. On the bracelet Judith wears is a depiction of Artemis—a Goddess who guarded her virginity carefully against those who tried to dishonor or rape her; those that threatened this met a violent end.

Subject
Judith was a well-off widow from the city of Bethulia. While the war with Assyrian army was at large, Bethulia was close to surrendering. The Assyrians were led by General Holofernes. Judith, pretending to become a woman of the opposite side in the war, devised a plan to kill Holofernes. Being a traditionally captivating woman with her beauty, Judith was brought back to Holofernes' private living quarters. Along with her side-woman and maid, Judith slayed Holofernes with his own sword. Severing the head, Judith put it in a knapsack, and returned to her home in Bethulia.

References

Paintings by Artemisia Gentileschi
1621 paintings
Paintings in the collection of the Uffizi
Paintings about death